Carl Craig (born May 22, 1969) is an American electronic music producer, DJ, and founder of the record label Planet E Communications. He is known as a leading figure and pioneer in the second wave of Detroit techno artists during the late 1980s and early 1990s. He has recorded under his given name in addition to a variety of aliases, including Psyche, BFC, and Innerzone Orchestra.

Craig has remixed a variety of artists including Manuel Göttsching, Maurizio, Theo Parrish, Tori Amos, and Depeche Mode. He was nominated for the 2008 Grammy Award for Best Remixed Recording for his remix of the Junior Boys track "Like a Child." He has released collaborative recordings with Moritz von Oswald (2008's Recomposed) and Green Velvet (2015's Unity).

Early life
Carl Craig was born in Detroit, Michigan, on May 22, 1969. His mother was a teacher's assistant and his father was a post office worker. He attended Cooley High School, where he developed an interest in music. He learned to play guitar and later became interested in club music through his cousin Doug Craig, who worked lighting for Detroit area parties. After hearing Derrick May's radio show on WJLB, Craig began experimenting with recording on a dual-deck cassette player. Craig met someone who knew May and passed along a tape of some of his home studio productions.

Career
Since 1989, Craig has released many recordings under a large number of aliases, including Psyche, BFC, 69, Paperclip People, and Innerzone Orchestra. Many of these early Psyche and BFC releases were collected on the 1996 compilation Elements 1989-1990. Craig founded his own record label called Planet E Communications in 1991. Since then, it has released records by other artists such as Kevin Saunderson, Moodymann, and Kenny Larkin.

His first studio album, Landcruising, was released on Blanco y Negro Records in 1995. In 1996, he released The Secret Tapes of Doctor Eich under the Paperclip People moniker. In 1997, he released More Songs About Food and Revolutionary Art. It was placed at number 29 on Pitchforks "50 Best IDM Albums of All Time" list. In 1999, he released Programmed under the Innerzone Orchestra moniker.

Craig served as co-creator and artistic director for the Detroit Electronic Music Festival in 2000 and 2001. His subsequent dismissal by festival organizers caused substantial controversy within the Detroit techno community, igniting a high-profile campaign in his favor. In 2001, he filed a breach-of-contract lawsuit against festival producer Pop Culture Media.

He released a reworked version of Landcruising, titled The Album Formerly Known As..., in 2005. In 2008, he released a collaborative album with Moritz Von Oswald, titled Recomposed, on Deutsche Grammophon. He returned as artistic director for the 2010 Detroit Electronic Music Festival. In 2015, he released a collaborative album with Green Velvet, titled Unity, on Relief Records. In 2017, he released Versus on InFiné.

Craig created a sound installation, titled Party/After-Party, which opened at the Dia Beacon art museum in March 2020. The culmination of a five-year-long engagement with Dia Beacon, it was his first foray into the art world.

Regarding the many positions he has held in the music industry (artist, producer, DJ, record label boss, and more), Craig has said, "I have a bad habit of getting my hands dirty in every little thing, and I really do enjoy it."

Style and legacy
Mixmag called Carl Craig "a leading figure in Detroit techno's second generation," while Exclaim! called him a "central figure" in the genre's second wave. Pitchfork described him as "techno pioneer." He has approached techno using inspiration from a wide range of musical genres, including soul, jazz, new wave, industrial, and krautrock, while his works have spanned ambient techno, breakbeat, house, classical, and modular synthesizer-based stylings. In a 2015 interview, he cited The Electrifying Mojo, Prince, Kraftwerk, Juan Atkins, and Jeff Mills as the major influences on his music.

Craig's 1992 track "Bug in the Bassbin", released under the Innerzone Orchestra moniker, was picked up by DJs such as 4hero, Goldie, and J Majik. In the United Kingdom, DJs started playing the track at 45 rpm instead of the intended 33 rpm. According to Now, the track "ended up providing inspiration and in many ways writing the blueprint for what drum 'n' bass was to become in England."

According to Vinyl Me, Please, Craig "managed to not only push the boundaries of Detroit techno, he also introduced an urgency and melodic richness to the sometimes navel-gazing world of IDM" with releases such as More Songs About Food and Revolutionary Art (1997).

Discography

Albums
 Landcruising (1995)
 The Secret Tapes of Doctor Eich (1996) 
 More Songs About Food and Revolutionary Art (1997)
 Programmed (1999) 
 The Album Formerly Known As... (2005)
 Recomposed (2008) 
 Unity (2015) 
 Versus (2017)

Compilations
 The Sound of Music (1995) 
 Elements 1989-1990 (1996) 
 Designer Music V1 (2000)
 Abstract Funk Theory (2001)
 From the Vault: Planet E Classics Collection Vol. 1 (2006)
 The Legendary Adventures of a Filter King (2009)

DJ Mixes
 DJ-Kicks: Carl Craig (1996)
 House Party 013: A Planet E Mix (1999)
 Onsumothasheeat (2001)
 The Workout (2002)
 Fabric 25 (2005)
 The Kings of Techno (2006) 
 Sessions (2008)
 Masterpiece (2013)
 Detroit Love (2019)

EPs
 4 Jazz Funk Classics (1991) 
 Sound on Sound (1993) 
 Lite Music (1994) 
 The Floor EP (1996) 
 Just Another Day (2004)
 Paris Live (2007)

Singles
 "Crackdown" (1990) 
 "No More Words" (1991)
 "Oscillator" (1991) 
 "Jam the Box" (1994) 
 "Throw" (1994) 
 "The Climax" (1995) 
 "Science Fiction" (1995)
 "Bug in the Bass Bin" (1996) 
 "Floor" (1996) 
 "4 My Peepz" (1998) 
 "People Make The World Go Round" (2000) 
 "A Wonderful Life" / "As Time Goes By" (2002)
 "Sparkle" / "Home Entertainment" (2005)
 "Darkness" / "Angel" (2006)
 "Sandstorms" (2017)

Awards and nominations

References

External links

 
 

1969 births
Living people
African-American DJs
American electronic musicians
American house musicians
American techno musicians
DJs from Detroit
Detroit techno
Universal Motown Records artists
Electronic dance music DJs